Jewish Memorial Hospital was a former hospital in New York City. It opened 1898 and subsequently relocated twice. The hospital permanently closed in 1982.

History
The 1934-built eight-story 186-bed Inwood, Manhattan hospital, like its earlier 1923 location, was planned as a "commemoration of Jewish veterans of World War I."

The Inwood building was opened in 1934 and expanded in 1959. In 1981 the Jewish Memorial Hospital was part of a three-hospital neighborhood primary care coalition described as novel and unique. In 1982, oversight agencies, after weighing reports that the hospital had serious "deficiencies" and recognition that it 
"serves a large minority community" forced it to close. An aftereffect of this closure, along with 30 others "in the last seven years" is an observation that it's  "harder to get a sick patient into a decent hospital without dangerous delay."

References

Defunct hospitals in Manhattan
Hospital buildings completed in 1938